The following is a list of All-American Girls Professional Baseball League players who formed part of the circuit  during its twelve years of existence.

See also
 List of All-American Girls Professional Baseball League players (A–C)
 List of All-American Girls Professional Baseball League players (D–G)
 List of All-American Girls Professional Baseball League players (H–L)
 List of All-American Girls Professional Baseball League players (M–R)

S
 
  * Surkowski also played under her married name of Lee Delmonico.

T

U

V

  * Vincent also played under her married name of Georgette Mooney.

W

  * Wiltse also played under her married name of Dorothy Collins.

Y

Z

References

S